Alan John Read (11 January 1945 – 5 November 1996) was born in Warrington, England and emigrated to Australia. He studied accounting and worked at various businesses across Sydney including Abbotsleigh boarding school.

Alan moved to Greystanes in 1974 and was very active in the community. He was President of the Greystanes Progress Association and initiated community action groups including the Canal Reserve Action Group (CRAG) and the Holroyd Association Against Airport (HAAAN).

CRAG was formed in 1994 to ensure the land around the Lower Prospect water canal was retained as open space following decommissioning of the canal. In 2003 a cycleway was completed along the length of the reserve and it was opened for use by the community. The Lower Prospect Canal Reserve was gazetted as Crown Land in 2004 and the reserve handed to Holroyd City Council as the Trustee.

Alan was a keen birdwatcher and for several years he compiled the Australia Day National Garden Bird Count for the Wildlife Preservation Society of Australia (now known as the Australian Wildlife Society).

Personal life
Alan married Frances Patricia O'Connor and together they had four children Christopher, Barbara, Leslie and John.

References

External links
Vale Alan Read
Lower Prospect Canal Reserve Web Site
CRAG the "save the canal" story 
Annual Garden Bird Count at The Sydney Morning Herald
How some light R&R read too much like heavy S&M at The Sydney Morning Herald
Out of control at The Sydney Morning Herald

1945 births
1996 deaths
English emigrants to Australia
People from Warrington